Edwin Thomas John Kerby (12 April 1885 – 5 July 1971) was an Australian politician.

Early life
Born in Ballarat, Victoria, he attended Grenville College before becoming a mining engineer and electrical contractor.

Military service
He served in World War I from 1914 to 1919. During his service he was awarded the 1914-15 Star, British War Medal, and the Victory Medal.

Politician
In 1919, he was selected as the Nationalist candidate for the Australian House of Representatives seat of Ballaarat, and defeated sitting Labor MP Charles McGrath by one vote, the closest result ever recorded for the House of Representatives. McGrath successfully challenged Kerby's election in the courts, and a by-election was held in 1920 and won by McGrath. Kerby became a businessman, focusing mainly on aviation, and became prominent among ex-servicemen's causes; he held the leadership of the RSL. He died in 1971.

Notes

References
 Sporting Politician Seeks Championship: Major Kerby to Oppose Victoria's Best Scullers, The Herald, (Friday, 5 March 1920), p.4.

1885 births
1971 deaths
Players of Australian handball
20th-century Australian politicians
Nationalist Party of Australia members of the Parliament of Australia
Members of the Australian House of Representatives for Ballarat
Members of the Australian House of Representatives